The Switch Drag Race is a Chilean  reality competition television series, presented by Mega as a Chilean version of the hit American show RuPaul's Drag Race. The purpose of the series is to find Chile’s top transformista (transformer, drag queen) of the season. 

Later, on the second season, the eligibility for competitors was expanded. The contestants were still predominantly from Chile & Argentina (with select returning queens from season one); the other half hailed everywhere from Puerto Rico, Spain, and Mexico, to Brazil and even France and the U.S. Similarly to its American counterpart, The Switch requires its contestants to sing live, lip-sync, dance, and perform impersonations. One of the most obvious differences is The Switch seemingly to place much greater focus on live vocal performances, and less time spent on craftwork, costume design, and comedy/acting.

After over two years’ hiatus, The Switch returned to MEGA for a second season, subtitled Desafío Mundial, on Sunday, March 25, 2018. Season two ended on June 15, 2018.

Format
Season 1 of The Switch consisted of seventeen participants, often split into two groups, that were challenged with demonstrating their ability to perform makeovers, impersonate female characters, dance, lip-sync, and sing live on stage. Along with the demonstration of their skills, The Switch shows each contestant's life story, giving details of their personal experiences to Chilean viewers.

Season 2 consists of six returning contestants from the previous season as well as seven new contestants from outside of Chile. The participants being split up into two groups; one group consisting of the returning contestants and the other group formed from their challengers from around the world.

Judging

Season 1

Season 2

See also 
 LGBT in Chile

References

External links 

 

Transgender-related television shows
2015 Chilean television series debuts
2015 in Chilean television
2016 in Chilean television
Chilean reality television series
2010s LGBT-related reality television series
Mega (Chilean TV channel) original programming
 
Television shows set in Chile
Chilean television series based on American television series